Alive Church, Lincoln is a Grade II*-listed parish church in the city of Lincoln, in Lincolnshire, England. It is an active place of worship and part of the Alive Church Christian branch. The church sits close to both Brayford Pool and University of Lincoln.

See also: Churches in Lincoln
Central Methodist Church, Lincoln
St Martin's Church, Lincoln
St Mary le Wigford
St Peter at Arches Church, Lincoln
St Benedict's Church, Lincoln
St Swithin's Church, Lincoln

References

Church of England church buildings in Lincolnshire
Grade II* listed churches in Lincolnshire
Alive Church, Lincoln